Valeriy Viktorovych Koliukh (born 18 April 1973) is a Ukrainian politician currently serving as a People's Deputy of Ukraine representing Ukraine's 92nd electoral district from Servant of the People since 29 August 2019.

Early life and career 
He is a doctor of political science.

From 2002, Koliukh was an assistant at the political science department of Shevchenko University. He was also a professor in the political science department prior to his election.

Political career 

During the 2002 Ukrainian parliamentary election, Koliukh ran a campaign to become a People's Deputy of Ukraine in Ukraine's 93rd electoral district. He was not elected. He ran again in the 2014 Ukrainian parliamentary election, this time in Ukraine's 92nd electoral district. He was again unsuccessful, winning only 2.83% of the vote.

Anti-corruption non-governmental organisation Chesno criticised Koliukh's involvement with the former, who fled Ukraine amidst investigations into his corruption. Koliukh was also a candidate for the Kyiv City Council from Batkivshchyna, but he was not successful.

In the 2019 Ukrainian parliamentary election, Koliukh ran as the Servant of the People candidate in the 92nd electoral district. At the time of the election, he was an independent. In an election marred by dirty tactics (such as the usage of candidates with similar names in an attempt to draw votes away from the main candidates), Koliukh won the election, winning with 24.76% of the vote. In the Verkhovna Rada (Ukraine's parliament), Koliukh joined the Servant of the People faction, as well as the Verkhovna Rada Committee on Education, Science, and Innovation.

References 

1973 births
Living people
Ninth convocation members of the Verkhovna Rada
People from Kyiv Oblast
Servant of the People (political party) politicians
Taras Shevchenko National University of Kyiv alumni